Park Myung-Suk (also Park Myeong-Seok; 박명석; born January 9, 1970) is a South Korean former Olympic wrestler.

Wrestling career
His sports club is Ma San City Hall.

Park won the gold medals at the 1989 Asian Wrestling Championships: 74.0 kg Greco-Roman, the 1992 and 1993 Asian Championships: 82.0 kg Greco-Roman, and the 1997 and 1998 Asian Championships: 85.0 kg Greco-Roman.

He competed for South Korea at the 1992 Summer Olympics in Barcelona, at the age of 22, in Wrestling--Men's Middleweight (82 kg), Greco-Roman. He lost to Thomas Zander of Germany in the first round, beat Jean-Pierre Wafflard of Belgium in the second round, and was defeated by Magnus Fredriksson of Sweden in the third round.

Park also competed for South Korea at the 1996 Summer Olympics in Atlanta at the age of 26 in Wrestling--Men's Middleweight (82 kg), Greco-Roman, and came in 14th.

References

External links
 

Living people
South Korean male sport wrestlers
Wrestlers at the 1992 Summer Olympics
1970 births
Olympic wrestlers of South Korea
Wrestlers at the 1996 Summer Olympics
Wrestlers at the 1998 Asian Games
Wrestlers at the 2002 Asian Games
Asian Games medalists in wrestling
Medalists at the 1998 Asian Games
Medalists at the 2002 Asian Games
Asian Games gold medalists for South Korea
Asian Games silver medalists for South Korea
Asian Wrestling Championships medalists
20th-century South Korean people
21st-century South Korean people